The Arabic word illa is a negative word corresponding to the English except, only and but.

Use
It is an often recurring phrase in the Qur'an, often used to give strength to statements by first negating all possibilities, and then referring to a subject. For example, in the Islamic Creed:
Arabic text:

Romanization:

English translations:
 I testify that there is no god but God, and I testify that Muhammad(Sallallahu alayhi wa Sallam) is the messenger of God.

This can also be seen in the prayer La hawla wa la quwwata illa billah, There is neither change nor power except by means of God.

See also
 Negation in Arabic

References

 Arabic words and phrases
 Arabic grammar